The Hawkwind, Friends and Relations series of albums was released in the early 1980s containing live and studio performances by Hawkwind and related bands.

It was released through the independent record company Flicknife Records, with the rights subsequently sold onto Cherry Red who continue to release packages through their Anagram label comprising this and other Hawkwind related material originally released by Flicknife Records.

In 2011, Flicknife Records restarted the series, under the name Hawklords Friends and Relations.

A review of the first installment in Record Business magazine called it "An album for the many dedicated Hawkfans."

Volume 1

 "Who's Gonna Win The War?" (Brock) - Hawkwind, Live '78
 "Golden Void" (Brock) - Sonic Assassins, Live '77
 "Robot" (Brock) - Hawkwind, Live '77
 "Raj Neesh" (I.C.U) - Inner City Unit, 1982
 "Good Girl, Bad Girl" (Moorcock, Pavli) - Michael Moorcock's Deep Fix, 1982
 "Valium Ten" (Bainbridge, Brock) - Hawkwind, 1978
 "Human Beings" (I.C.U) - Inner City Unit, 1982
 "Time Centre" (Moorcock, Pavli) - Michael Moorcock's Deep Fix, 1982

Volume 2 – Twice Upon A Time
 "Earth Calling" (Calvert) – Hawkwind, London Sundown 30-Dec-1972
 "We Do It" (Hawkwind) – Hawkwind, BBC session 19-Apr-1971
 "Spirit of the Age" (Calvert, Brock) – Hawkwind, Leicester 29-Sep-1977
 "The Changing" (Bainbridge) – Harvey Bainbridge, 1983
 "Phone Home Elliot" (Turner, Bainbridge, Brock) – Uncle Nik & The ETs, 1983
 "Work" (Strange, Griffin) – Richard Strange featuring Martin Griffin, 1983
 "The Man with the Golden Arm" (Elmer Bernstein, Sylvia Fine) – Nik Turner, 1983
 "Motherless Children" (Traditional) – Dave Brock, 1983

Volume 3
 "Psychedelia Lives" (Hawkwind) – Hawkwind, Glastonbury 1981
 "Drug Cabinet Key" [aka "Flying Doctor"] (Calvert, Brock) – Hawklords, Uxbridge 1978
 "Wired for Sound" [aka "Earthed to the Ground"] (Brock) – Dave Brock, 1984
 "Widow Song" (Calvert) – Robert Calvert, 1984
 "Toad On The Road" (N. Alman, Waki Gumbo Jr) – Alman Mulo Band, 1984
 "When The Going Gets Tough" (Brock) – Dave Brock, 1983
 "Vampire" (Pavli, Theaker) – Stravinsky Shoe, 1984
 "Canes Venatici" (Rix, Rix) – Underground Zerø, 1983

The Best of Hawkwind, Friends and Relations
 "Spirit Of The Age" – Hawkwind – from Volume 2
 "Raj Neesh" – Inner City Unit – from Volume 1
 "Robot" – Hawkwind – from Volume 1
 "Canes Venatici" – Underground Zerø – from Volume 3
 "Dodgem Dude" – Michael Moorcock's Deep Fix
 "Golden Void" – Sonic Assassins – from Volume 1
 "Lord Of The Hornets" – Robert Calvert
 "Motherless Children" – Dave Brock – from Volume 2
 "Sweet Mistress Of Pain" – Hawkwind Zoo
 "Social Alliance" – Hawkwind- from Zones 
 "Outside The Law" – Lloyd Langton Group
 "Time Centre" – Michael Moorcock's Deep Fix – from Volume 1
 "Vampire" – Stravinsky Shoe – from Volume 3
 "Over the Top" – Sonic Assassins
 "Space Invaders" – Inner City Unit
 "Psi Power" – Hawkwind – from "This Is Hawkwind, Do Not Panic"

Hawkwind, Friends and Relations: The Rarities
 "Aimless Flight" – Underground Zerø
 "Psychedelia Lives" – Hawkwind – from Volume 3
 "Working Time" – Lloyd Langton Group
 "Rainbow Warrior" – Underground Zerø
 "Brothel in Rosenstrasse" – Michael Moorcock's Deep Fix
 "Toad On The Road" – Alman Mulo Band – from Volume 3
 "Earth Calling" – Hawkwind- from Volume 2
 "The Changing" – Harvey Bainbridge – from Volume 2
 "The Widow Song" – Robert Calvert – from Volume 3
 "Starcruiser" – Michael Moorcock's Deep Fix
 "I.C.U." – Inner City Unit
 "I See You" – Lloyd Langton Group
 "Human Beings" – Inner City Unit
 "Atom Bomb"- Atomgods
 "Phone Home Elliot" – Uncle Nik and The ETs – from Volume 2

Hawkwind Friends and Relations Volume 6 – Cosmic Travellers
 "The Right Stuff" – Pressurehead
 "Between Worlds" – Underground Zerø
 "We Do It" – Hawkwind – from Volume 2
 "Grid Co/ordinate Vorp One" – Anubian Lights
 "Time Of The Hawklords" – Hawklords
 "Venusian Skyline" – Melting Euphoria
 "The Master" – Helios Creed
 "A Trip To G9" – Spiral Realms
 "Seeing Strange Lights" – Dark Matter
 "Pre Cambrian Shuffle" – The Brain
 "Space Does Not Care" – Zero Gravity

Hawklords Friends and Relations: A New Dawn The 30th Anniversary

 "Digital Age" - Earthlab   
 "Fly Into The Night" - Gunslinger 
 "Robot" - (live) - The Hawklords  
 "Felice" - Underground Zero  
 "My Secret Buddha" - DanMingo  
 "Outlaw" - Steve Swindells  
 "The Naked and Transparent Man" - Bob Calvert  
 "Make Believe It Real" - Spirits Burning  
 "Stream" - Harvey Bainbridge   
 "Vision Quest" - Bedouin  
 "Angel Down" - Alan Davey

Release history
 Volume 1: LP, Mar-1982, Flicknife Records, SHARP101
 Volume 2: LP, Apr-1983, Flicknife Records, SHARP107
 Volume 3: LP, Apr-1985, Flicknife Records, SHARP024
 Best Of: CD, Mar-1993, Anagram Records/Flicknife Records, CDMGRAM61
 The Rarities: CD, Mar-1995, Anagram Records/Flicknife Records, CDGRAM91
 Volume 6: Apr-1996, CD, Anagram Records/Flicknife, CDGRAM105
 Best Of And The Rarities: Dec-2001, 2CD, Anagram Records, CDGRAM152
 Hawklords, Friends and Relations: The 30th Anniversary Volume: 2011, CD, Flicknife Records SHARPCD11051

References

Hawkwind compilation albums
Compilation album series
1992 compilation albums